The Northeast-10 Conference (NE-10) is a college athletic conference affiliated with the National Collegiate Athletic Association (NCAA) at the Division II level. Member institutions are located in the northeastern United States in the states of Connecticut, Massachusetts, New Hampshire, New York, and Vermont. It is the only Division II collegiate hockey conference in the United States.

History

The original 1980 conference was called the "Northeast 7" as the colleges were American International College, Assumption College, Bentley College, Bryant College, the University of Hartford, Springfield College, and Stonehill College. In 1981, Saint Anselm College was the eighth team to join and the resulting "NE-8" stayed this way until 1984 when the University of Hartford left and Merrimack College joined.

The “Northeast-10” name came about in 1987 when Saint Michael's College and Quinnipiac College joined the league. The conference remained stable until 1995 when Springfield College left for Division III. The league stayed at ten members as Le Moyne College joined the league in 1996 from the New England Collegiate Conference (NECC) and briefly expanded to eleven when Pace University joined in 1997 from the New York Collegiate Athletic Conference (NYCAC). Quinnipiac moved to the Division I Northeast Conference (NEC) to again return the membership to ten.

The last major expansion took place prior to 2000, when five new schools joined the fold. Franklin Pierce College, Southern New Hampshire University (SNHU; formerly New Hampshire College), the University of Massachusetts Lowell (UMass Lowell), and Southern Connecticut State University (SCSU) and the College of Saint Rose (Saint Rose) giving the NE10 15 members.

Since the addition of those five institutions, the league has added football, indoor track and field, and outdoor track and field as championship sports. The expansion continued in 2003–04 as the conference added another three championships – men's swimming and diving, women's swimming and diving, and men's ice hockey. However, because the NE10 is the sole Division II men's ice hockey league, its postseason champion cannot compete for the NCAA national hockey championship.

David Brunk, the first full-time commissioner in league history, announced in April he was resigning July 1, 2007 to take over the Peach Belt Conference. Brunk had been commissioner since 1998. Julie Ruppert became the next full-time commissioner in June 2008, becoming the first female Division II commissioner in the country.

In 2008, Bryant University announced it would begin the five-year process that would make them a full Division I member by 2012; at the same time the NE10 announced that it had given a bid to University of New Haven and they had accepted. In December 2007, Adelphi University announced it had joined the league and began playing in 2009–10. To start the 2008–09 academic year the NE10 still had 15 members and expanded to 16 in 2009-10.

On July 1, 2013, UMass Lowell left the NE10 to join the Division I America East Conference. With the departure of UMass Lowell, the Northeast-10 Conference had 15 remaining members.

The most recent changes to the conference membership, both taking effect with the 2019–20 school year, were announced in 2018. First, Merrimack announced that it would begin a transition to Division I and join the Northeast Conference (the same move that Bryant made in 2008). Then, Long Island University announced that it would unify its two athletic programs—the Division I LIU Brooklyn Blackbirds and the Division II LIU Post Pioneers, the latter of which was a NE10 affiliate member in field hockey and football at the time of announcement—into a single D-I athletic program under the LIU name. As such, the LIU Post field hockey team was merged with LIU Brooklyn's previously existing team in that sport, and the LIU Post football team became the new LIU football team, competing as a Division I FCS team in the Northeast Conference. Thus, the NE10 was at a total of 14 member schools. In 2022, the number was reduced to 13 with Stonehill College's announcement of its departure for Division I's Northeast Conference.

Chronological timeline
 1980 - The Northeast-10 Conference (NE10) was founded. Charter members included American International College, Assumption College (now Assumption University), Bentley College (now Bentley University), Bryant College (now Bryant University), the University of Hartford, Springfield College, and Stonehill College effective beginning the 1980-81 academic year.
 1981 - Saint Anselm College joined the NE10, effective in the 1981-82 academic year.
 1984 - Hartford left the NE10 to join the Division I ranks of the National Collegiate Athletic Association (NCAA) and the ECAC North Atlantic Conference, effective after the 1983-84 academic year.
 1984 - Merrimack College joined the NE10, effective in the 1984-85 academic year.
 1987 - Quinnipiac College (now Quinnipiac University) and Saint Michael's College joined the NE10, effective in the 1987-88 academic year.
 1995 - Springfield (Mass.) left the NE10 to join the NCAA Division III ranks and the New England Women's and Men's Athletic Conference (NEWMAC), effective after the 1994-95 academic year.
 1996 - Le Moyne College joined the NE10, effective in the 1996-97 academic year.
 1997 - Pace University joined the NE10, effective in the 1997-98 academic year.
 1998 - Quinnipiac left the NE10 to join the NCAA Division I ranks and the Northeast Conference (NEC), effective after the 1997-98 academic year.
 2000 - Franklin Pierce College (now Franklin Pierce University), the University of Massachusetts at Lowell (UMass Lowell),  New Hampshire College (now Southern New Hampshire University), the College of Saint Rose and Southern Connecticut State University joined the NE10, effective in the 2000-01 academic year.
 2001 - Long Island University–Post (LIU–Post) joined the NE10 as an affiliate member for football, effective in the 2001 fall season (2001-02 academic year).
 2008 - Bryant left the NE10 to join the NCAA Division I ranks and the NEC, effective after the 2007-08 academic year.
 2008 - LIU–Post left the NE10 as an affiliate member for football, effective after the 2007 fall season (2007-08 academic year).
 2008 - The University of New Haven joined the NE10, effective in the 2008-09 academic year.
 2009 - Adelphi University joined the NE10, effective in the 2009-10 academic year.
 2013 - UMass–Lowell left the NE10 to join the NCAA Division I ranks and the America East Conference, effective after the 2012-13 academic year.
 2013 - LIU–Post re-joined the NE10 as an affiliate member for football, but also included field hockey, effective in the 2013 fall season (2013-14 academic year).
 2019 - Merrimack left the NE10 to join the NCAA Division I ranks and the NEC, effective after the 2018-19 academic year.
 2019 - LIU–Post left the NE10 as an affiliate member for football and field hockey, as the school announced that it would merge with LIU–Brooklyn to unify its athletic programs, effective after the 2018 fall season (2018-19 academic year).
 2019 - Four institutions joined the NE10 as affiliate members: Mercy College, Molloy College and St. Thomas Aquinas College for field hockey; and Post University for men's ice hockey, effective in the 2019-20 academic year.
 2022 - Stonehill left the NE10 to join the NCAA Division I ranks and the NEC, effective after the 2021-22 academic year.

Member schools

Current members
The NE10 currently has 13 full members, all but one are private schools:

Notes

Affiliate members
The NE10 currently has four affiliate members, all are private schools:

Former members
The NE10 had seven former full members, all but one were private schools:

Notes

Former affiliate members 
The NE10 had one former affiliate member, which was also a private school:

Notes

Membership timeline

Conference facilities

Presidents' Cup Champions

Sports

Men's sponsored sports by school

Women's sponsored sports by school

Other sponsored sports by school

Notes

Championships

References

External links

 
Articles which contain graphical timelines